Below is a list of squads used in the 1992 African Cup of Nations.

Group A

Nigeria 
Coach:  Clemens Westerhof

Senegal 
Coach:   Claude Le Roy

Kenya 
Coach:  Gerry Saurer

Group B

Cameroon  
Coach:   Philippe Redon

Zaire  
Coach: Kalala Mukendi

Morocco  
Coach:   Werner Olk

Group C

Ivory Coast 
Coach: Yeo Martial

Congo 
Coach: Noël-Pepe Minga

Algeria 
Coach: Abdelhamid Kermali

Group D

Ghana  
Coach:   Otto Pfister

Zambia  
Coach: Samuel Ndhlovu

Egypt  
Coach: Mahmoud El-Gohary

References
 (RSSSF)

Africa Cup of Nations squads
squads